Geoffrey Robinson Bennett (born April 25, 1980) is an American broadcast journalist and a co-anchor of the PBS NewsHour alongside Amna Nawaz. He has worked as an editor, reporter and news anchor on radio, cable and broadcast television, and online.

Early life 
Bennett grew up in Voorhees, New Jersey. His father, Gary Bennett Sr., was a school administrator. His mother, Lynnca, taught kindergarten.  He has an older brother, Gary Bennett Jr.

Career 
Bennett graduated with honors from Morehouse College with a BA in English in 2002. During his senior year, he pursued an internship at ABC News where he was mentored by Carole Simpson, then the weekend anchor of ABC World News Tonight.

The internship led to his first job in journalism, an off-air production assistant at World News Tonight at ABC News in New York and then associate producer.

In 2006, he took a job as a reporter and editor for the online service AOL Television.  He covered television and the entertainment industry and said that work honed his interviewing skills.

In 2007, he joined NPR in Los Angeles as a digital producer and editor for News & Notes, and was regularly heard on-air. He moved to Washington, D.C. in 2009 to be an editor at Weekend Edition.

Starting in 2013, he reported on-camera from Washington, D.C., for NY1 News and other Time Warner Cable news channels.  He was also a guest host of Washington Journal on C-SPAN.

He returned to NPR in 2017 as an on-air reporter based in Washington, D.C., covering Congress and the White House.

In November 2017, he became a White House correspondent for NBC and substitute anchor for MSNBC. In September, 2021, on the day that police and paramedics were indicted in the death of Elijah McClain, he choked up while reading the young African-American man's last words. 

In November 2021, while continuing to contribute to NBC and MSNBC, he started work as the chief Washington correspondent for the PBS NewsHour and the anchor of PBS News Weekend.

He and Amna Nawaz have been co-anchors of the PBS NewsHour since January 2023, when they replaced Judy Woodruff.

Personal life 

He is married to Carolyn Elizabeth "Beth" Bennett  Perry. They have one son and live in the Washington, D.C. area.

References 

American television journalists
C-SPAN people
MSNBC people
NBC News people
NPR personalities
PBS people
Morehouse College alumni
1980 births
Living people